Gamma Circini, Latinized from γ Circini, is a star system in the constellation Circinus. It was noted as a double star by Herschel in 1835, who estimated the separation as 1 arc second. It is visible to the naked eye with an apparent visual magnitude of 4.51. Based upon an annual parallax shift of 7.27 mas, it is about 450 light-years away.

This is a wide binary star system and may even be a triple star. The two visible components orbit each other with a preliminary estimated period of 258 years and a large eccentricity of 0.931. As of 2014, the visible components have an angular separation of 0.80 arc seconds on a position angle of 359°.

The primary star, component A, is a B-type subgiant star with a stellar classification of B5 IV. Based upon isochrone curve fitting it is hypothesized to be a pair of matching B5 stars, and is a Be variable with an uncertain maximum. It has an effective temperature of 15,135 K and an estimated mass six times that of the Sun. The companion, component B, is an F-type main-sequence star with a stellar classification of F8 V. It has an effective temperature of 4,786 K.

References

External links
http://server3.wikisky.org/starview?object_type=1&object_id=1111

B-type subgiants
F-type main-sequence stars
Be stars
Circinus (constellation)
Circini, Gamma
Durchmusterung objects
136415
075323
5704